The Ambassador of Australia to Egypt is an officer of the Australian Department of Foreign Affairs and Trade and the head of the Embassy of the Commonwealth of Australia to the Arab Republic of Egypt. The current ambassador, since November 2018, is Glenn Miles, who resides in Cairo. The Ambassador also holds non-resident accreditation as Ambassador to Eritrea, Syria and Sudan. Australia opened its first embassy in the Arab world in Cairo, in 1950. There existed an embassy in Damascus, Syria from 1977 to 1999. Prior to 1977, accreditation for Syria was held by the embassies in Beirut, Lebanon (1973–1976) and Baghdad, Iraq (1976–1977). In 1991, with its independence, accreditation for Eritrea was held by the High Commission in Nairobi, until it was transferred to the embassy in Cairo in 2006.

After the Australian Government closed its post in Syrian embassy in 1999, the Ambassador to Egypt was named responsible for representing Australian interests in Syria.

List of heads of mission

Notes
 Also non-resident Ambassador to the Syrian Arab Republic, since 1999.
 Also non-resident Ambassador to the Republic of the Sudan, since 1999.
 Also non-resident Ambassador to the State of Eritrea, since 2006.

References

External links
Australian Embassy Egypt

 
Egypt
Australia